Nineveh Township is one of nine townships in Johnson County, Indiana. As of the 2010 census, its population was 3,987 and it contained 1,688 housing units. Nineveh Township took its name from Nineveh Creek.

Geography

References

External links

 Indiana Township Association
 United Township Association of Indiana

Townships in Johnson County, Indiana
Townships in Indiana